Mary Joe Fernández and Robin White were the defending champions, but Fernández did not compete this year. White teamed up with Lindsay Davenport and lost in the quarterfinals to tournament winners Lisa Raymond and Chanda Rubin.

Raymond and Rubin won the title by defeating Amanda Coetzer and Linda Harvey-Wild 6–4, 6–1 in the final.

Seeds

Draw

Draw

References

External links
 Official results archive (ITF)
 Official results archive (WTA)

Nichirei International Championships
1993 WTA Tour